Caladenia praecox, commonly known as early caladenia or early caps is a plant in the orchid family Orchidaceae and is endemic to south-eastern Australia. It is a ground orchid with a single leaf and up to four white flowers which are often tinged with green or pink.

Description
The backs of the sepals and petals have dark red glandular hairs. The sides of the labellum turn upwards and have stalked teeth and the tip is curled under. There are four or six rows of crowded calli in the mid-line of the labellum. Flowering occurs from August and October.

Taxonomy and naming
Caladenia praecox was first formally described in 1926 by William Nicholls and the description was published in The Victorian Naturalist. The specific epithet (praecox) is a Latin word meaning "too early ripe" or "precocious". Although recognised by the Royal Botanic Gardens, Melbourne as a valid name, C. praecox is regarded as a synonym of Caladenia dimorpha by the Royal Botanic Gardens, Kew.

Distribution and habitat
Caladenia praecox is widespread in Victoria especially in the Victorian goldfields and is often recorded from areas to the north-east of Melbourne, growing in open forest and woodland. In also occurs in the south-east of New South Wales.

Conservation
Caladenia praecox is not listed under the Victorian Flora and Fauna Guarantee Act 1988.

References 

praecox
Plants described in 1926
Endemic orchids of Australia
Orchids of Victoria (Australia)
Orchids of New South Wales